Diocese of Cloyne may refer to:

 Roman Catholic Diocese of Cloyne
 Diocese of Cork, Cloyne and Ross (Church of Ireland)